Dave's One Night Stand is a British stand-up comedy programme that began in 2010. The show has stand-up comedians takes the viewers on a tour of somewhere in the United Kingdom or Ireland and then perform a comedy routine in the local theatre, the location is often the place where they live although there are some exceptions.  Each comedian is joined by two supporting acts.  Each series comprises five episodes.  As of 12 December 2012, 20 episode have been broadcast across four series.

Episode list
The viewers and Dave's weekly rank for each episode are from BARB.  The viewers listed only show those for the original broadcast of each episode on Dave, not including timeshift channel Dave ja vu.

:† indicates the location is not the hometown of the headline act.

Series 1

Series 2

Series 3

Series 4

References

External links

Lists of British comedy television series episodes
Lists of British non-fiction television series episodes